Axel Pons Ramón (born 9 April 1991) is a Grand Prix motorcycle racer and model from Spain. His father Sito Pons is a former double World Champion in the 250cc class. He is a former competitor of the Spanish 125GP Championship, prior to competing at Grand Prix level. Aside from racing he is working as a model and currently managed by the Spanish agency Sight.

Career statistics

Grand Prix motorcycle racing

By season

By class

Races by year
(key) (Races in bold indicate pole position, races in italics indicate fastest lap of the race)

References

External links

125cc World Championship riders
Moto2 World Championship riders
Spanish motorcycle racers
Motorcycle racers from Catalonia
Sportspeople from Barcelona
1991 births
Living people
250cc World Championship riders